Phtheochroa retextana is a species of moth of the family Tortricidae. It is found in the Caucasus, Daghestan and Central Asia.

The wingspan is about 18 mm.

References

Moths described in 1874
Phtheochroa